Thriller is the third studio album by pub rock band Eddie and the Hot Rods, reaching #50 on the UK Albums Chart. Released in 1979, it was produced by Peter Ker. The album builds on the sound they established on the previous studio record Life on the Line. Shortly after the release of Thriller, the band was sacked by their record company and forced to join EMI Records. The album was reissued in 2002 with two bonus tracks: "Horror Through Straightness" and "Highlands 1 Hopefuls 2".  These songs had been the B-sides to the singles released on the LP.

The album featured two singles: "Media Messiahs" and "The Power and the Glory", neither of which charted on the UK Singles Chart.

Linda McCartney provided backing vocals on "The Power and the Glory". Reception of the album was muted.

Track listing
"The Power and the Glory" (Graeme Douglas) - 4:16
"Echoes" (Paul Gray, Steve Nicol) - 2:54
"Media Messiahs" (Graeme Douglas) - 2:54
"Circles" (Dave Higgs) - 2:55
"He Does It with Mirrors" (Dave Higgs, Graeme Douglas) - 4:12
"Strangers" (Graeme Douglas) - 2:46
"Out to Lunch" (Dave Higgs) - 4:48
"Breathless" (Graeme Douglas, Paul Gray) - 3:33
"Take It or Leave It" (Barrie Masters, Graeme Douglas) - 4:12
"Living Dangerously" (Dave Higgs) - 3:36
"Horror Through Straightness" (Dave Higgs, Steve Nicol, Paul Gray) - 4:25
"Highlands 1 Hopefuls 2" (Dave Higgs, Barrie Masters) - 3:00

Personnel
Eddie and the Hot Rods
Barrie Masters - vocals
Graeme Douglas - guitar, backing vocals
Dave Higgs - guitar, backing vocals
 Paul Gray - bass guitar, backing vocals
Steve Nicol - drums, backing vocals
with:
Jools Holland - piano
Lee Brilleaux - harmonica
Linda McCartney - backing vocals on "The Power and the Glory"

Charts

References

1979 albums
Eddie and the Hot Rods albums
Island Records albums